The Battle of Bassignana was fought in the Italian campaign of the War of the Austrian Succession on 27 September 1745. It resulted in a victory for the combined armies of the Bourbon kingdoms of France and Spain and the Genoese Republic over Austria and the Kingdom of Sardinia.

The Bourbon armies, finally united after a two-year campaign, won through a maneuver that caused 25,000 Austrian troops to head towards Piacenza and leave their Sardinian allies isolated. The Sardinians were then overwhelmed and beaten.

The Spanish forces along with a strong contingent of Genoese captured a series of towns: Tortona, Parma, Piacenza and threatened to take Milan. The Austrians moved to protect the capital of Lombardy leaving Charles Emmanuel III, the king of Sardinia, unaided with his force of 55,000. He was defeated by Gages at Bassignano who subsequently advanced the conquest of Lombardy against the advice of the French commanders who preferred the reduction of Piedmont. Gages took Casale and Milan on 16 December where the citadel held out against him. The cities of Lodi and Como soon surrendered and by the end of 1745 all of Lombardy, except for the fortress at Mantua and the citadel in Milan, were under the control of Spain and France.

The Austrians were now unable to oppose the Spanish advance and support Piedmont to keep Charles Emmanuel in the war and the campaign had disastrous results for Maria Theresa. In order to reinforce Austrian armies in Italy peace with Prussia was a necessity and the Second Silesian War would have to be ended. As a result of the gains of the Spanish and French, Charles Emmanuel reopened negotiations with D'Argenson for an understanding between France and Sardinia and possible treaty.

With the end of the Second Silesian War, Austrian was able to send 30,000 soldiers into Italy under Count Maximilian Ulysses Browne and negotiations between France and Sardinia fell apart.
The Battle of Piacenza in the following year turned back the French and the Spanish and erased the effects of Bassignano.

Notes

References
 Browning, Reed (2008). The War of the Austrian Succession. St. Martin's Griffin. .

External links
Success won by Marshal Maiilebois and Don Infante Philip, followed by greater disasters from Voltaire's histories

Bassignano
Bassignana
Bassignana
Bassignana
Bassignana
Bassignana
1745 in Italy
1745 in Austria
1745 in France
Bassignano
Bassignano